Dr. M. Brian Blake (born 1971) is an American computer scientist/software engineer and the eighth president of Georgia State University.  He was previously the executive vice president for academic affairs and provost at George Washington University; executive vice president of academic affairs and the Nina Henderson Provost at Drexel University; the dean of the graduate school and vice provost for academic affairs at the University of Miami; an associate dean for research and professor at the College of  Engineering at the University of Notre Dame; and department chair and professor of computer science at Georgetown University.

Blake was named as the most promising scientist in 2003 by Career Communications  and recognized as a Top 10 Emerging Scholar in Diverse Issues in Higher Education. His research has received more than $12 million in funding, and he is an author of more than 225 scholarly publications. He is an ACM Distinguished Scientist and a Fellow of the IEEE. Blake has also been a strong advocate for increasing diversity in the study of computer science and other STEM disciplines.

Early life 
M. Brian Blake was born and raised in Savannah, Georgia, and graduated from Benedictine Military School in 1989 and Georgia Institute of Technology in 1994. He spent six years working as a software architect, technical lead and expert developer with General Electric, Lockheed Martin, General Dynamics and The MITRE Corporation. While employed by Lockheed Martin, Blake earned his master's degree in electrical engineering from Mercer University and his doctoral degree from George Mason University.

Career 
In 1999, Blake became an adjunct professor in Georgetown University's Department of Computer Science. He was promoted to associate professor in 2005, becoming the youngest tenured African-American computer science professor in the nation. Blake was named chair of the Department of Computer Science in 2007. He was also director of graduate studies as the department launched its first graduate program, and ran a research group in Web-based systems that undertook more than $6 million in sponsored research.

Blake joined the University of Notre Dame in 2009 as professor of computer science and engineering and associate dean of engineering for research and graduate studies. His role included faculty development, student recruitment and diversity strategies, and working with corporate and foundation partners.

In July 2012, Blake was named vice provost for academic affairs and dean of the Graduate School at the University of Miami. He was responsible for research on the university's Coral Gables campus, and worked with the deans of Miami's schools and colleges and the Faculty Senate on efforts to diversify the university's faculty. He oversaw graduate programs serving more than 5,200 students across 11 schools and colleges as dean of the Graduate School.

Blake became the provost and executive vice president for academic affairs at Drexel University on August 1, 2015. He served as the chief academic officer of Drexel with responsibility for all academic functions, and the Office of the Provost oversees every academic program and supports academic and administrative offices. Under Blake's academic oversight, Drexel had its largest, most academically gifted freshman class, the University's highest retention rate, the highest overall research activity in history  leading to the University's first-ever Carnegie Classification as a R1 Doctoral University: Very High Research Activity  as well as a significant increase in the enrollment of professional master students. During his first four years, he had overseen the hire of 10 Deans and more than 75 faculty while significantly increasing the diversity of administrative offices. Blake's leadership of academic space planning led to new facilities for the College of Computing and Informatics and the School of Education. Blake oversaw the creation of several contemporary centers, including the Fabric Discovery Center, the Weight, Eating, and Lifestyle Science (WELL) Center, and the University's new Teaching and Learning Center. In 2017, Blake was named the Nina Henderson Provost  which recognizes and enables his central programs that enhance interdisciplinary initiatives across the institution. He conceived innovative interdisciplinary programs such as Drexel Areas of Research Excellence (DARE)  and Market-Driven Academic Program Ventures (MPV)  which have been credited with helping enhance research and graduate education, respectively. He also oversaw the creation of the Drexel Business Solutions Institute  and the Experiential Edge program, which extended Drexel's mission for experiential learning.

On November 1, 2019, Blake joined George Washington University as its provost and executive vice president for academic affairs. Blake joined President Thomas LeBlanc's team just after the university announced a controversial new enrollment strategy and after GW's U.S. News rank dropped 14 points in the previous two years. During his term, Blake reversed this trend by 7 points leading GW to an overall U.S. News National ranking of 63. Blake led the creation of several academic planning initiatives to consider future enrollments and virtual instruction  and also led the creation of a decentralized model to evolve GW’s research infrastructure. Blake also envisioned and led a successful initiative to provide full need to Pell-eligible students at GW starting Fall 2021. Blake’s tenure has coincided with university frustration at the administration that has been expressed in various ways, including a faculty poll expressing concerns about the presidential leadership team. During his time as Provost, Blake was also on the short list to become president of the University of Rhode Island. On June 10, 2021, he was named the sole finalist for the position of President of Georgia State University.

In 2021, Blake became the eighth president of Georgia State University and the institution's first African-American president. Blake is leading a new strategic vision for Georgia State that emphasizes four pillars: Research and Innovation, Student Success, College to Careers, and Identity and Placemaking.

Personal life 
Blake is married to Bridget Blake, project management consultant for The MITRE Corporation. The couple has two sons.

References

External links
 
 Drexel Press Release

1971 births
University of Notre Dame faculty
American computer scientists
Living people